Schuyler, Hartley & Graham was the largest firearm dealer in the United States in 1860.

History
Jacob Rutsen Schuyler (1816–1887), Marcellus Hartley (1828–1902) and Malcolm Graham (1832–1899) incorporated their company on March 1, 1854.

In 1876 Schuyler retired from the company and by 1880 they changed the name to Hartley and Graham.

Schuyler died in 1887.

Malcolm Graham died in December 1899 and the company was reincorporated as M. Hartley Company. Marcellus Hartley died on January 8, 1902.

The archives are held by the McCracken Research Library.

References

1854 establishments in the United States
Firearm manufacturers of the United States
American companies established in 1854
Manufacturing companies established in 1854